South of Panama is a 1941 American action film directed by Jean Yarbrough and written by Ben Roberts and Sidney Sheldon. The film stars Roger Pryor, Virginia Vale, Lionel Royce, Lucien Prival, Duncan Renaldo and Lester Dorr. The film was released on May 2, 1941, by Producers Releasing Corporation.

Plot
Jan Martin, sister of government chemist Paul Martin, realizes she is being followed by enemy agents after her brother. She ignores him at the Panama airport and embraces a stranger, Mike Lawrence, instead. Enemy agents Lake and Wilton are convinced that Mike is her brother and attempt to trap the pair. They get away but Jan disappears. Disguised with a black wig and new makeup, Jan becomes Dolores and gets a job singing at a cafe. Spotting Jan without her disguise, Mike follows her down an alley where they are trapped by Raynor, another espionage agent. They get away and Jan also gets away from Mike. Later, both Mike and Jan are captured and the agents realize that Mike is not the brother they are after. Paul is brought to the hideout, but Mike gets the drop on them.

Cast      
Roger Pryor as Mike Lawrence  
Virginia Vale as Janice 'Jan' Martin aka Dolores Esteban
Lionel Royce as Burns
Lucien Prival as Raynor
Duncan Renaldo as Captain of Police
Lester Dorr as Joe
Jack Ingram as Wilton
Hugh Beaumont as Paul Martin
Warren Jackson as Lake
Edward Keane as Colonel Stoddard
Sam McDaniel as Rodriguez Lincoln 'Rod' Jones

References

External links
 

1941 films
American action films
1940s action films
Producers Releasing Corporation films
Films directed by Jean Yarbrough
American black-and-white films
1940s English-language films
1940s American films